Lleyton Hewitt was the defending champion, but lost in the quarterfinals to Andreas Seppi.

James Blake won in the final 6–2, 3–6, 7–6(7–3) against Igor Andreev.

Seeds

Draw

Finals

Top half

Bottom half

References
Main Draw
Qualifying Draw

- Mens Singles, 2006 Medibank International